Events in the year 1907 in Ireland.

Events
 2 January – A new system of rail cars running from Dublin Amiens Street station to Howth was introduced.
 5 January – The first motor show under the auspices of the Irish Automobile Club opened at the Royal Dublin Society.
 6 January – The Sunday provisions of the new Licensing Act come into operation in Dublin and four other cities. Sunday opening hours would be from 2pm to 5pm.
 26 January – The first performance of J. M. Synge's play The Playboy of the Western World at the Abbey Theatre in Dublin triggered a week of rioting.
 4 May – The Irish International Exhibition opened in Dublin.
 7 May – Augustine Birrell introduced the Irish Council Bill; it was rejected by a Nationalist convention on 21 May and dropped by the government on 3 June.
 6 July – The Crown Jewels of Ireland, valued at £50,000, were stolen from a safe in Dublin Castle.
 10–11 July – King Edward VII and Queen Alexandra made a state visit to attend the Irish International Exhibition in Dublin.
 26 July – A large rally was held in Belfast City Hall in support of the continuing Dockers and Carters strike.
 4 September – An Irish Parliamentary Party meeting in the Mansion House, Dublin was disrupted by Sinn Féin who held a demonstration outside.
 17 October – The Marconi transatlantic wireless telegraphy service between Galway and Canada was opened. Messages were exchanged without a hitch.
 9 November – The Irish International Exhibition ended after six months. An estimated 2.75 million people visited it, including a large number from abroad.
 November – Irish republican Tom Clarke returned to Ireland from the United States.

Arts and literature
 26 January – Large sections of the audience booed the opening performance of J. M. Synge's The Playboy of the Western World at the Abbey Theatre.
 28 January – Another performance of The Playboy of the Western World at the Abbey Theatre was interrupted by the audience who continued to boo, hiss and shout.
 4 February – In a public debate at the Abbey Theatre, the poet W. B. Yeats denied trying to suppress audience distaste during a performance of The Playboy of the Western World.
 May – James Joyce's poems Chamber Music were published.
 Early – Seven-year-old future author Elizabeth Bowen moved with her mother from Ireland to the south of England.
 Publication of Padraic Colum's poems Wild Earth.
 Peadar Kearney and Patrick Heeney wrote A Soldier's Song (with English lyrics); it later became Amhrán na bhFiann (in Irish), the Irish national anthem.
 Publication of County Cork-born retired Chicago chief of police Francis O'Neill's collection The Dance Music of Ireland.

Sport

Association football
 International
 16 February – England 1–0 Ireland (in Liverpool)
 23 February – Ireland 2–3 Wales (in Belfast)
 16 March – Scotland 3–0 Ireland (in Glasgow)
  
 Irish League
 Winners: Linfield F.C.

 Irish Cup
 Winners: Cliftonville F.C. 0–0, 1–0 Shelbourne F.C.

Golf
 The British Ladies Amateur Golf Championship was held at Royal County Down Golf Club, (winner: May Hezlet).

Births
 21 February – Colville Deverell, cricketer and politician (died 1995).
 1 March – Robert Malachy Burke, Christian Socialist and philanthropist (died 1998).
 15 May – John Galvin, Fianna Fáil party Teachta Dála (TD) (died 1963).
 1 June – Helen Megaw, crystallographer (died 2002 in Northern Ireland).
 2 June – Dan O'Keeffe, Kerry Gaelic footballer (died 1967).
 29 June – Paul O'Dwyer, lawyer and politician in the United States (died 1998).
 13 July – John David Gwynn, cricketer (died 1998).
 15 July – Seamus Murphy, sculptor (died 1975).
 14 August – H. Montgomery Hyde, barrister, author and Ulster Unionist Member of Parliament (MP) (died 1989 in Northern Ireland).
 14 September
 Janet McNeill, novelist and playwright (died 1994 in England)
 Edel Quinn, lay missionary (died 1944).
 8 October – J. G. Devlin, actor (died 1991 in Northern Ireland).
 28 October – John Hewitt, poet (died 1987 in Northern Ireland).
 1 November – Bill Loughery, cricketer (died 1977 in Northern Ireland).
 26 November – Theodore William Moody, historian (died 1984).
 19 December – Jimmy McLarnin, boxer (died 2004 in Northern Ireland).
Full date unknown
 Desmond Clarke, librarian and writer (died 1979).
 Maura Laverty, writer, journalist, and broadcaster (died 1966).
 Áine Ní Cheanainn, educationalist (died 1999)
 Margot Ruddock, actress, poet, and singer (died 1951).
 Henry Tyrell-Smith, motor cycle racer (died 1982).

Deaths
 16 January – Daniel John O'Donoghue, printer, labour leader, and politician in Ontario (born 1844).
 20 January – Agnes Mary Clerke, astronomer and writer (born 1842).
 31 January – Timothy Eaton, businessman, founded Eaton's department store in Canada (born 1834).
 11 February – William Howard Russell, journalist (born 1821).
 16 March – John O'Leary, Irish poet and Fenian (born 1830).
 9 April – Owen Hall, theatre writer and critic (born 1853).
 1 May – John Kells Ingram, poet, scholar, economist, and historian of economic thought (born 1823).
 10 June – Alexander John Arbuthnot, British official in India and writer (born 1822).
 8 July – John Horgan, politician and member of the Western Australian Legislative Council (born 1834).
 3 August – Augustus Saint-Gaudens, sculptor (born 1848).
 7 August – James Brenan, artist (born 1837).
 13 August – George Charlemont, former Gaelic footballer (born 1873).
 17 November – Francis Leopold McClintock, Royal Navy officer, explorer in Canadian Arctic Archipelago (born 1819).
 17 December – William Thomson, 1st Baron Kelvin, mathematical physicist, engineer, and leader in the physical sciences (born 1824).
 Full date unknown
 Robert Cain, brewer and businessman (born 1826).
 Denis Kearney, politician in America (born 1847).

References

 
1900s in Ireland
Ireland
Years of the 20th century in Ireland
Ireland